Chessy is a commune in the eastern suburbs of Paris, in the Seine-et-Marne department in the Île-de-France region in north-central France.

Chessy is famous as the location of Disneyland Paris, which lies for the most part on the territory of the commune of Chessy.

Chessy is located in Val d'Europe, the fastest growing sector in the "new town" of Marne-la-Vallée, boosted by the development of Disneyland Paris.

Demographics
A village of only 760 inhabitants in 1982, Chessy was since then absorbed by the suburbs of Paris, and due to strong demographic growth the population reached 3,438 in 2007. The population of Chessy reached 6,304 in 2019.

The inhabitants are called Cassassiens.

Transport
Chessy is served by two stations on Paris RER line : 
 Val d'Europe
 Marne-la-Vallée–Chessy (this station is located at the hub area of Disneyland Paris).

Marne-la-Vallée–Chessy station is also served by high speed trains towards Lille, Lyon, Nantes and Bordeaux.

Education
Three preschool and elementary schools, L'école maternelle et élémentaire Cornélius, L'école maternelle et élémentaire Gaïus, and L'école maternelle et élémentaire Tournesol, are in Chessy.

There is a junior high school in Chessy, Collège Le vieux Chêne. Nearby is the Collège Jacqueline de Romilly in Magny-le-Hongre.

Senior high schools in the surrounding area include Lycée Emilie Brontë in Lognes, Lycée Emilie du Châtelet in Serris, Lycée Pierre de Coubertin in Meaux, Lycée Martin Luther King in Bussy-Saint-Georges, Lycée René Cassin in Noisiel, and Lycée Van Dongen in Lagny-sur-Marne. Vocational high schools in the surrounding area include Emilie du Châtelet, Lycée technique Pierre de Coubertin, LEP Auguste Perdonnet in Thorigny-sur-Marne, LEP Charles Baudelaire in Meaux, and LEP Louis Lumière in Chelles.

Politics 
Chessy is a part of Seine-et-Marne's 8th constituency.

See also
Communes of the Seine-et-Marne department

References

External links

1999 Land Use, from IAURIF (Institute for Urban Planning and Development of the Paris-Île-de-France région) 
 

Communes of Seine-et-Marne
Val d'Europe